An apotropaic mark, also called a witch mark or anti-witch mark, is a symbol or pattern scratched on the walls, beams and thresholds of buildings to protect them from witchcraft or evil spirits. They have many forms; in Britain they are often flower-like patterns of overlapping circles.

Marks on buildings

Apotropaic marks (from Greek apotrepein "to ward off" from apo- "away" and trepein "to turn") are symbols or patterns scratched into the fabric of a building with the intention of keeping witches out through apotropaic magic. Evil was thought to be held at bay through a wide variety of apotropaic objects such as amulets and talismans against the evil eye. Marks on buildings were one application of this type of belief.

Other types of mark include the intertwined letters V and M or a double V (for the protector, the Virgin Mary, alias Virgo Virginum), and crisscrossing lines to confuse any spirits that might try to follow them.

At the Bradford-on-Avon Tithe Barn, a flower-like pattern of overlapping circles is incised into a stone in the wall. Similar marks of overlapping circles have been found on a window sill dated about 1616 at Owlpen Manor in Gloucestershire, as well as taper burn marks on the jambs of a medieval door frame.

The marks are most common near places where witches were thought to be able to enter, whether doors, windows or chimneys. For example, during works at Knole, near Sevenoaks in  Kent, in 1609, oak beams beneath floors, particularly near fireplaces, were scorched and carved with scratched witch marks to prevent witches and demons from coming down the chimney. 

Marks have been found in buildings including Knole House, Shakespeare's Birthplace in Stratford-upon-Avon, the Tower of London, and many churches, but little effort has been made to look for them on secular buildings. A collection of over 100 marks - previously thought to be graffiti - was discovered in 2019 on the walls of a cave network at Creswell Crags in Nottinghamshire.

See also
Taper burn mark

References

Anthropology of religion
Magic symbols
Folklore
Objects believed to protect from evil